All Saints Church is a Church of England parish church in Fordham, Essex. The church is a Grade I listed building.

History
All Saints' Anglican Church dates from about 1340. It was restored in 1861. There was also a chapel of the Countess of Huntingdon's Connexion in the village in the 19th century.

Among the past rectors of the parish of Fordham was Roger Walden (died 1406), who was briefly Archbishop of Canterbury and then Bishop of London. The noted classical scholar Thomas Twining, a member of the tea-merchant family, held the curacy of the church from 1764 until his death in 1804.

Present day
All Saints Church is the parish church of Fordham and is part of the Diocese of Chelmsford. On 7 April 1965, the church was designated a Grade I listed building.

All Saints Church is within the Conservative Evangelical tradition of the Church of England, and it has passed resolutions that reject the ordination of women.

Gallery

See also

References

External links
 Parish website
 A Church Near You entry

Fordham
Fordham
Fordham